Jorge G. Allen (born 12 July 1956) is a former Argentine rugby union player. He played as a flanker.

Career
Starting with CASI, Allen was the first player of his country to play in a South African team: in 1982, he was contracted by the Natal Sharks for two seasons.
At the time, Allen had debuted for Argentina, against Canada, at Buenos Aires in 1981, although his absolute debut was in 1980 with the South American Jaguars representative team, who played in that year four matches against the Springboks. He was also part of the squad which won the 1985 South American Rugby Championship (only test match, against Uruguay); two years later, he was called up for the Pumas at the 1987 Rugby World Cup in Australia and New Zealand, during which he played all the three pool stage matches (Fiji, Italy and New Zealand). 
Allen also won the South American Rugby Championship in 1987 and 1989; in the latter year, he also played his last international match, against USA.

After the South African experience, Allen played also in Italy, for L'Aquila Rugby before returning to Argentina, to San Isidro and end there his career.

Notes

External links

Va a ser muy bueno para Hernández, entrevista a Jorge Allen

1956 births
Living people
Argentine rugby union players
Rugby union flankers
Sportspeople from Buenos Aires Province
Argentina international rugby union players